Peter Rees may refer to:
 Peter Rees, Baron Rees (1926–2008), British politician
 Peter Rees (footballer) (born 1932), Welsh footballer
 Peter Rees (producer) (born 1966), American-Australian film and television producer